Theo Tsiounis (born 15 December 1982) is a former semi-professional soccer player who currently coaches Para Hills Knights, and previously coached Adelaide Comets from 2016 until 2019.

Career
Throughout his playing career, he played for various South Australian clubs, winning the 2000 SASF State League with Adelaide Olympic at the age of 17, winning the 2007 FFSA State League, scoring 12 goals during the campaign, and in 2009, Tsiounis and Adelaide Cobras were FFSA Premier League premiers, losing the Grand Final on a penalty shootout against Cumberland United.

During his managerial career, he has been runner-up in the National Premier Leagues South Australia in 2019 with Adelaide Comets and State League One South Australia runner-up in 2022 with Para Hills Knights.

References

1982 births
Living people
Soccer players from Adelaide